Kate Lawler (born 7 May 1980) is an English television personality, presenter, model and DJ. She became the first female winner of Big Brother UK after winning the third series of the reality series in 2002. Since Big Brother, she has presented various radio shows including Capital FM and Virgin Radio. She has also appeared in television series including Celebrity Wrestling and Love Island.

Big Brother 
Lawler entered the third series of Big Brother on day one in 2002. The series lasted 64 days. During her time on Big Brother she received two strikes out of a possible three. Housemates received strikes for breaking Big Brother rules. Any housemate that received three strikes would be ejected from the Big Brother house. Lawlers first strike was for discussing nominations with Allison. Her second strike was for sending a birthday message to her twin sister. The final episode of the series was watched in 10.01 million households. Lawler won Big Brother 3, which meant she was the first woman to win the UK version of Big Brother.

Later career
In September 2002, Lawler became a DJ on Capital FM, a position she held until December 2003. She co-presented the Channel 4 breakfast TV show RI:SE from February 2003 until it was axed in December of that year. In 2005, she was one of the competitors in the ITV show Celebrity Wrestling, competing under the name The Brawler. She helped her team, The Warriors, win the team championship, but was eliminated in the semi-finals of the individual competition by fellow model Leilani Dowding.

Lawler wrote a twice-weekly Big Brother 7 column for The Sun online for the duration of the series.

On 14 August 2006, Lawler entered Love Island 2 as a new arrival. She was third-top female in the final.

In 2006, Lawler appeared on Brainiac: Science Abuse, receiving an electric shock in an "electric chair". She was a presenter on Playdate, a late-night dating programme on ITV2.

Lawler has appeared in various men's magazines, including Loaded, Front, Nuts and Zoo. On 24 July 2006 Ann Summers announced that Lawler would be the company's new model in its lingerie advertisements.

In 2007 Lawler appeared on the BBC comedy Rob Brydon's Annually Retentive.

On 1 October 2007 Lawler joined Kerrang! Radio, co-presenting the breakfast show, The Morning After, alongside Tim Shaw from 7 a.m.–10 a.m. When Shaw was suspended from the station on 23 April 2008, Lawler temporarily helmed the breakfast show on her own until Shaw's dismissal was confirmed. At this point, on 12 May 2008, she moved to Drive!, Kerrang's 4 p.m.–7 p.m. show, which she presented on her own until OJ Borg joined the show as her co-presenter on 27 October 2008. After the departure of Borg in October 2009, she became a solo presenter once again. Lawler was nominated for a Sony Radio Award for Best Entertainment in 2013. Kerrang stopped broadcasting on FM in the West Midlands, and was just broadcast digitally in the summer of 2013, and Lawler was made the breakfast host.

On 26 January 2008 Lawler returned to Big Brother as a hijacker for a day in the new show Big Brother Celebrity Hijack. She ran the Flora London Marathon on 13 April 2008 wearing only Ann Summers lingerie, raising funds for the Cystic Fibrosis Trust.

She appeared on the BBC gameshow Hole in the Wall in autumn 2009 and won the £10,000, which she donated to a cystic fibrosis charity.

On 18 September 2010 she appeared on Celebrity Total Wipeout, coming third.

In 2013, Lawler joined Manchester-based Key 103; her show was networked on other northern stations such as Radio Aire, Viking FM and Rock FM, scheduled Monday–Thursday from 10p.m. to 1a.m. In summer 2014 Liverpool's Radio City 96.7 also began broadcasting the show. She also started to do the shows from Sunday through to Thursday. Lawler's last show with Key 103 was in May 2015. Lawler continued to host her Kerrang Radio Breakfast show each morning until February 2016, in which she joined Virgin Radio, which launched on 30 March, with Lawler hosting weekday afternoons from 1 p.m. to 4 p.m. In August 2019, Lawler moved to present Drivetime on Virgin Radio which runs from 4 p.m. to 7 p.m. She also started a podcast called Maybe Baby in 2019.

References

External links 
 
 The Morning After webpage
 
 Recent interview
 Lawler's blog

1980 births
Living people
Big Brother (British TV series) winners
English female models
English television presenters
People from Beckenham
Virgin Radio (UK)